Green Peter Reservoir is a reservoir created by Green Peter Dam on the Middle Santiam River  northeast of Sweet Home, Oregon, United States. The reservoir is used for hydropower, recreation, flood risk management, water quality, irrigation, and as a fish and wildlife habitat.

Recreation 
Whitcomb Creek Park is a  rustic park with 77 basic camp sites, 4 pull-through sites, and a boat ramp. Whitcomb Creek Park also has a separate group camping area that holds up to 100 people.

Thistle Creek Boat Ramp is on the north shore of the reservoir. It is open year-round, and the boat ramp was extended in 1999 allowing access to the reservoir at winter low pool.

Quartzville Group Camp, roughly  up Quartzville Drive, is available to rent.

Whitcomb Creek Park, Thistle Creek Boat Ramp, and Quartzville Group Camp are operated by Linn County Parks and Recreation.

See also

 Foster Reservoir
 List of lakes in Oregon

References

Reservoirs in Oregon
Lakes of Linn County, Oregon
Buildings and structures in Linn County, Oregon
Protected areas of Linn County, Oregon
Sweet Home, Oregon